Matthew or Matt Mason may refer to:

 Matt Mason (author) (born 1978), author and creative executive
 Matt Mason (poet) (born 1968), poet based in Omaha, Nebraska
 Matt Mason (cricketer) (born 1974), cricketer who represented Western Australia and Worcestershire
 Matthew Mason (Welsh cricketer) (born 1984), Welsh cricketer
 Matthew T. Mason (born 1952), American roboticist
 Major Matt Mason, an action figure created by Mattel
 Major Matt Mason USA, performing name of Matt Roth, New York City-based musician and record producer
 Matthew Mason-Cox, Australian politician
 Matt Mason (singer) (born 1980s), singer based in Nashville, Tennessee
 Matt Mason, a character on the U.S. television series Falling Skies
 Matt Mason (sailor), New Zealand sailor
 Matthew E. Mason, American historian

See also
 Mason (surname)